Marguerite Chapman (March 9, 1918 – August 31, 1999) was an American film and television actress.

Biography 
Born in Chatham, New York, Chapman was working as a telephone switchboard operator in White Plains, New York when her good looks brought about the opportunity to pursue a career in modeling. Signed by the John Robert Powers Agency in New York City, she modeled in product advertisements that ran nationally. 

During that year of modeling she was made aware that producer Howard Hughes was in New York screening for a new movie he planned to make. Unannounced, she went to Hughes and asked for a chance to be in his picture. He gave her a screen test, which went well. Though Hughes never did film the movie, he showed the screen test to a number of Hollywood studio executives. 

She signed with 20th Century Fox and moved to Hollywood in late 1939. She went on to be placed under contract with Warner Brothers in 1941, and then with Columbia from 1942 to 1948.

She made her film debut in 1940, working for the next two years in small roles. In 1942, her big break came with Republic Pictures when she was cast in the leading female role in the twelve-part adventure film serial Spy Smasher, a production that has been ranked among the best serials ever made. 

Chapman soon began receiving more leading roles and appeared opposite important stars such as Edward G. Robinson and George Sanders. With America's entry in World War II, she entertained the troops, worked for the War bond drive and at the Hollywood Canteen. She also starred in the famous pro-Soviet war film Counter-Attack, released in 1945.

In 1950, she starred opposite war-hero-turned-actor, Audie Murphy, in Kansas Raiders. She has the distinction of being the actress who gave Audie Murphy his first on-screen kiss. During the 1950s, Chapman performed mostly in secondary film roles, including The Seven Year Itch. In the early 1960s she appeared on television shows including Rawhide, Perry Mason, and Four Star Playhouse.

Outside of acting, Chapman was a painter whose work was featured at the Beverly Hills Art League Gallery. She was also a Democrat who supported the campaign of Adlai Stevenson during the 1952 presidential election.

Chapman was reportedly asked to audition for the role of "Old Rose" Dawson-Calvert in the 1997 James Cameron epic Titanic but was prevented by poor health.

For her contribution on television, Marguerite Chapman has a star on the Hollywood Walk of Fame at 6284 Hollywood Boulevard.

Marguerite Chapman died August 31, 1999, aged 81, and was interred in Holy Cross Cemetery, Culver City, California. 

Her funeral was held on September 4, 1999, at St. Charles Borromeo Catholic Church in North Hollywood, California, where she was a parishioner.

Filmography

References

External links

 
 
 Photographs and literature
 Photos of Marguerite Chapman in 1940s films by Ned Scott
 Marguerite Chapman at aenigma

1918 births
1999 deaths
20th-century American actresses
Actresses from California
Actresses from New York (state)
Female models from California
American film actresses
American television actresses
Burials at Holy Cross Cemetery, Culver City
People from Chatham, New York
Warner Bros. contract players
Female models from New York (state)
Western (genre) film actresses
Western (genre) television actors
20th-century American women artists
20th-century American painters
California Democrats
New York (state) Democrats
Catholics from New York (state)